Miss Universe 1976, the 25th Miss Universe pageant, was held on 11 July 1976 at the Lee Theatre in Hong Kong. Rina Messinger of Israel was crowned by Anne Marie Pohtamo of Finland. This was the first and only time that an Israeli has won the competition. It was the only time in the pageant's history that the event was held in Hong Kong.

Results

Placements

Contestants

  - Taliilani Ellen Letuli
  - Lilian Noemi De Asti
  - Cynthia Marlene Bruin
  - Julie Anne Ismay
  - Heidi-Marie Passian
  - Sharon Elaine Smith
  - Jewell Sharon Nightingale
  - Yvette Maria Aelbrecht
  - Vivienne Anne Hollis
  - Carolina Elisa Aramayo Esteves
  - Katia Celestina Moretto †
  - Normande Jacques
  - Maria Veronica Sommer
  - Maria Helena Reyes Abisambra
  - Silvia Jiminez Pacheco
  - Anneke Dijkhuizen
  - Brigitte Trolle
  - Norma Lora
  - Gilda Plaza
  - Mireya Carolina Calderon Tovar
  - Pauline Davies
  - Suvi Lukkarinen
  - Monique Uldaric
  - Birgit Margot Hamer
  - Melina Michailidou
  - Pilar Martha Laguana
  - Blanca Alicia Montenegro
  - Nannetje Johanna Nielen
  - Victoria Alejandra Pineda Fortin
  - Rowena Lam
  - Gudmunda Hulda Johannesdottir
  - Naina Sudhir Balsavar
  - Yuliarti Rahayu
  - Elaine Rosemary O'Hara
  - Rina Messinger
  - Diana Scapolan
  - Miyako Iwakuni
  - Chung Kwang-hyun
  - Laurine Wede Johnson
  - Monique Wilmes
  - Teh-Faridah Norizan
  - Mary Grace Ciantar
  - Marielle Tse-Sik-Sun
  - Carla Jean Evert Reguera ­†
  - Janey Kingscote
  - Ivania Navarro Yenic
  - Candelaria Flores Borja
  - Bente Lihaug
  - Carolina Maria Chiari
  - Eva Regina Arni
  - Nidia Fatima Cardenas
  - Rocío Rita Lazcano Mujica †
  - Elizabeth Samson de Padua
  - Elizabeth Zayas Ortiz
  - Carol Jean Grant
  - Linda Tham
  - Cynthia Classen
  - Olga Fernandez Perez
  - Genevieve Bernedette Parsons
  - Angela Huggins
  - Peggy Vandeleuv
  - Caroline Westerberg
  - Isabelle Fischbacher
  - Katareeya Areekul
  - Margaret Elizabeth McFarlane
  - Manolya Onur †
  - Leila Luisa Vinas Martinez
  - Barbara Elaine Peterson
  - Judith Josefina Castillo
  - Lorraine Patricia Baa
  - Sian Adey-Jones
  - Svetlana Radojcic

Notes

Debuts

Returns
Last competed in 1973:
 
Last competed in 1974:

Withdrawals
  - Janet Joan Joseph
 
  - Angela Ruddock
  - Ramona Karam
 
  - Instead of the region, the delegates from Northern Marianas had been represented themselves as the individual territory since then.

Did not Compete
  - Cleopatra Sanders
  - Irene Penn
  Tahiti - Amiot Mora

Awards
  - Miss Amity (Margaret McFarlane)
  - Miss Photogenic (Pauline Davies)
  - Best National Costume (Rocío Lazcano)

General references

External links
 Miss Universe official website

1976
1976 in Hong Kong
1976 beauty pageants
Beauty pageants in Hong Kong
July 1976 events in Asia